Fangatapu Apikotoa, (born 31 August 1983) is a Tongan rugby union player who currently plays for the Tautahi Gold in the World Rugby Pacific Challenge. His preferred position is fly half but also can slot into the centre and full back positions.

He also played his rugby for the Marist Ma'ufanga Rugby Club in the Datec Cup Provincial Championship in Tonga.

He made his test debut for Tonga against Samoa on May 24, 2004, and has played 18 test matches and scored 87 points.

He signed for Coventry R.F.C. in the English Championship for the 2009/2010 season, making his debut against the Exeter Chiefs in September 2009.

References

External links
 

Tongan rugby union players
Tonga international rugby union players
Living people
1983 births
Coventry R.F.C. players
Tongan expatriate rugby union players
Expatriate rugby union players in England
Place of birth missing (living people)
Rugby union fly-halves
UE Santboiana players
Expatriate rugby union players in Spain
Tongan expatriate sportspeople in Spain